Fitsum Alemu Fekir (born 15 July 1995) is an Ethiopian professional footballer who plays as an attacking midfielder for Ethiopian Premier League club Bahir Dar Kenema and the Ethiopia national team.

Club career
Born in Dessie, Ethiopia, Alemu began his senior career with Fasil Kenema before moving to Bahir Dar Kenema in 2019.

International career
Alemu made his international debut with the Ethiopia national team in a 1–0 friendly loss to Uganda on 13 October 2019.

References

External links
 
 

1995 births
Living people
Sportspeople from Amhara Region
Ethiopian footballers
Association football midfielders
Ethiopia international footballers
2021 Africa Cup of Nations players
Ethiopian Premier League players
Fasil Kenema S.C. players
Bahir Dar Kenema F.C. players